Belkis Rodríguez (born 14 May 1965) is a Cuban retired female tennis player.

Playing for Cuba at the Fed Cup, Rodríguez had a win–loss record of 22–13.

ITF Finals

Singles (2-2)

Doubles (7-7)

References

External links 
 
 

1965 births
Living people
Cuban female tennis players
Pan American Games medalists in tennis
Pan American Games bronze medalists for Cuba
Tennis players at the 1987 Pan American Games
Central American and Caribbean Games medalists in tennis
Central American and Caribbean Games gold medalists for Cuba
Central American and Caribbean Games bronze medalists for Cuba
Tennis players at the 1991 Pan American Games
Medalists at the 1987 Pan American Games
Medalists at the 1995 Pan American Games